CIS International School is a family of international schools and kindergartens, which are part of CIS Education Group. School was founded in 2009 and now has over 600 students from more than 20 different countries. Children from expatriate families (embassy workers or employees of multinational companies) and prominent Russian families study Cambridge International Curriculum provided by Cambridge International Examinations, the world’s largest provider of international education programmes and qualifications for 5–19 year olds. CIS Russia offers Early Years Preschool (2–5 years), Cambridge Primary (5–11 years), Cambridge Secondary 1 (11–14 years), Cambridge Secondary 2 (14–16 years, IGCSE) and Cambridge Advanced (16–19 years, A-levels and Cambridge Pre-U). CIE qualifications are recognised for admission by UK universities (including Cambridge) as well as universities in the United States, Canada, European Union, Middle East, West Asia, New Zealand, India, Pakistan, Sri Lanka and around the world.

Campuses 
CIS Education Group has following campuses:
 Campus 1 – CIS Skolkovo Campus, located in Russia (Early Years, Primary school, Secondary School and Sixth Form)
 Campus 2 – CIS Moscow Campus, located in Russia (Early Years, Primary school, Secondary School and Sixth Form)
 Campus 3 – CIS Saint Petersburg Campus, located in Russia (Early Years, Primary school, Secondary School and Sixth Form)
 Campus 4 – CIS Tashkent Campus, located in Uzbekistan (Early Years, Primary school, Secondary School and Sixth Form)
 Campus 5 – CIS Gorki Campus, located in Russia (Early Years, Primary school, Secondary School and Sixth Form)

Students from different campuses interact with each other during regular cross campus activities.

Tuition fees 
The tuition fees range from 900 00 RUB + 5 000 EUR to 1 300 000 RUB + 7 500 EUR and includes school meals, textbooks and classroom materials, but does not include transport services, private lessons, summer courses, and the school uniform.

References

External links 
cisedu.com
cie.org.uk

International schools in Moscow
Cambridge schools in Russia
Educational institutions established in 2009
2009 establishments in Russia